Deepak Nayyar (born 1946) is an Indian economist and academician. He is a professor of economics at Jawaharlal Nehru University, New Delhi and Chairperson of the Board of Governors of Centre for the Study of Developing Societies (CSDS) New Delhi. He has taught at the University of Oxford, the University of Sussex, the Indian Institute of Management Calcutta (IIM-C), and the New School for Social Research, New York City.  He was Vice Chancellor of the University of Delhi from 2000 to 2005.

Early life and education
He graduated from St. Stephen's College, Delhi, University of Delhi.  Thereafter, as a Rhodes Scholar, he went on to study at Balliol College, University of Oxford, where he obtained a B.Phil. and a D. Phil in Economics.  His 1974 doctoral thesis was titled "An Analysis of the Stagnation in India's Cotton Textile Exports" under the supervision of P. P. Streeten.

Career

His academic career has been interspersed with short periods in the government.  He was in the Indian Administrative Service.  For some time, he worked as economic adviser in the Ministry of Commerce.  Later, he was chief economic adviser to the Government of India and secretary in the Ministry of Finance.

Nayyar is an honorary fellow of Balliol College, Oxford.  And he is chairman of Sameeksha Trust, which publishes Economic and Political Weekly. He served as chairman of the board of governors of the World Institute for Development Economics Research, UNU-WIDER, Helsinki, from 2001 to 2008 and vice president of the International Association of Universities, Paris, from 2004 to 2008. He was on the board of directors of the Social Science Research Council in the United States from 2001 to 2007 and was chairman of the advisory council for the Department of International Development, Queen Elizabeth House, University of Oxford, from 2004 to 2007. He has received the VKRV Rao award for his contribution to research in Economics.  He has been President of the Indian Economic Association. He is also on the Editorial Board of several professional journals.

He has served as a member of many commissions, committees and boards: both national and international. He is a member of the National Knowledge Commission in India. He is a member of the board of the South Centre, Geneva. He has been a Member of the World Commission on the Social Dimension of Globalization. He has served as a Director on several corporate boards, including State Trading Corporation of India, State Bank of India, Export-Import Bank of India and Maruti Udyog. At present, he is a Director on the Boards of the SAIL and ICRA.

His research interests are primarily in the areas of international economics, macroeconomics and development economics. He has published papers and books on a wide range of subjects, including trade policies, industrialization strategies, macroeconomic stabilization, structural adjustment, economic liberalization, trade theory, macro policies, international migration and the multilateral trading system. In addition, he has written extensively on economic development in India. Globalization and development is an area of focus in his present research.

Publications 
Nayyar has published more than 50 papers in academic journals.  He is the author, co-author or editor of 12 books, which include: India's Exports and Export Policies (Cambridge University Press, 1976 and 2008), Migration, Remittances and Capital Flows (Oxford University Press, 1994), The Intelligent Person's Guide to Liberalization (Penguin Books, 1996), Trade and Industrialization (Oxford University Press, 1998), Governing Globalization: Issues and Institutions (Oxford University Press, 2002), Stability with Growth: Macroeconomics, Liberalization and Development (Oxford University Press, 2006) Trade and Globalization (Oxford University Press, 2008) Liberalization and Development (Oxford University Press, 2008).

References

1946 births
Academics of the University of Sussex
Alumni of Balliol College, Oxford
Indian development economists
Fellows of Balliol College, Oxford
20th-century Indian economists
Academic staff of the Indian Institute of Management Calcutta
Indian Rhodes Scholars
Academic staff of Jawaharlal Nehru University
Living people
Scientists from Delhi
St. Stephen's College, Delhi alumni
The New School faculty
Vice-Chancellors of the University of Delhi
Indian male writers
21st-century Indian economists
Chief Economic Advisers to the Government of India